Potaninia may refer to:
 Potaninia (beetle), a genus of beetles in the family Chrysomelidae
 Potaninia (plant), a genus of plants in the family Rosaceae